This is a list of public art in Rosenborg Castle Gardens in Copenhagen, Denmark.

See also
 List of public art in Ørstedsparken

Rosenborg Castle Gardens
Parks in Copenhagen
Copenhagen-related lists
Rosenborg Castle Gardens